Ernest Lawrence Steeves (born February 12, 1961) is a Canadian politician, who was elected to the Legislative Assembly of New Brunswick in the 2014 provincial election. He represents the electoral district of Moncton Northwest as a member of the Progressive Conservatives. He was re-elected in the 2018 and 2020 provincial elections.

Since 2018, Steeves has been Minister of Finance in the Higgs government.

Steeves is a former Radio Broadcaster who has worked on air at: CFQM-FM (1982-1984), CHAM-AM, CKCW-AM, CFDR-AM, and CJMO-FM.

References

1961 births
Living people
Progressive Conservative Party of New Brunswick MLAs
People from Moncton
Politicians from Fredericton
Finance ministers of New Brunswick
Members of the Executive Council of New Brunswick
21st-century Canadian politicians